360°, also known as Dread Zone... ...360° is the first album by the British band Dreadzone. It was released in 1993 on Creation Records and set forth the combination of dub, trance, electro and sampling for which Dreadzone was to become well-known. Although unsuccessful in the charts, the album attracted the attention of John Peel, who gave it significant airplay.

The album cover is highly similar to the early covers in The Best Dance Album in the World... Ever! series.

Track listing

Samples and influences
"L.O.V.E." begins with a sample of dialogue from Night of the Hunter (1955), spoken by Robert Mitchum:
"L-O-V-E! You see these fingers, dear hearts? These fingers has veins that run straight to the soul of man. The right hand, friends, the hand of love. Now watch, and I'll show you the story of life".
The dialogue "We're going to have an orgasm that you can't even comprehend" is an extract from Diane Keaton's documentary Heaven. Piano fragments are sampled from "Moments in Love" by Art of Noise. The closing words "And what is love? ....Love is the inspiration of poets and philosophers.  Love is the voice of music" are spoken by Burt Lancaster in  the 1960 film Elmer Gantry.
"The Good, The Bad And The Dread" "When you hear a strange sound, drop to the ground" is spoken by Charles Bronson in the 1968 film Once Upon a Time in the West. Musical samples are taken from Ennio Morricone's score for For a Few Dollars More (1965).
"The Warning" The opening dialogue section
Don't move.
That's what you get for messin' with the police
Hands behind your heads, interlock your fingers, down on your knees. Let's go
is taken from the 1988 film Colors. A snatch of dialogue from Rocky ("Ooh! Ahh! Come on!") is used as a rhythmic trope.
"Dream On" samples a cry "Marijuana!" from the 1970 film Woodstock.
"Skeleton At The Feast" : "Like a little grain of gold glittering in sand" and other snatches of dialogue are from the 1936 film The Man Who Could Work Miracles.

Personnel 
 Greg Roberts – keyboards, synthesizer, programming
 Tim Bran – keyboards, synthesizer, programming, mixing, engineering
 Melanie Guillaume – vocals
 Deborah Irie – vocals
 Dan Donovan – keyboards
 Alison Goldfrapp – vocals (tracks 4, 7)
 Ted Hayton – editing

References 

 Discography at Discogs
 Dreadzone band website
 Dreadzone album website

1993 debut albums
Dreadzone albums
Creation Records albums